José María "Pechito" López (born 26 April 1983) is an Argentine race car driver who is currently competing in the FIA World Endurance Championship with Toyota Gazoo Racing and 2014–2016 World Touring Car Champion. He raced in the 2006 GP2 Series for the Super Nova team, and previously for the DAMS team, and the CMS team in Formula 3000. He was also at Renault F1 as a test driver. He was supposed to make his Formula One debut in 2010 for US F1 Team but the team shut down before contesting a single race. On 16 December 2013 he joined the Citroën Total WTCC team for the  World Touring Car Championship season. He won 10 races that year and clinched his first World Touring Car Championship. In 2015 he repeated the feat, again winning 10 races and the championship. In 2016, he again retained the title with eight wins.

Career

Early career
López began in karting, before moving to the Formula Renault 2000 Eurocup in 2001, finishing in 17th position, taking one pole position and one fastest lap. He stayed in the series for the 2002 season driving for Cram Competition, finishing in fourth position, taking one victory. He also drove for Cram in Italian Formula Renault that year, where he became champion, taking four wins, beating Robert Kubica to the crown. He moved on to the Formula Renault V6 Eurocup in 2003, making his first association with the DAMS team, winning the title with five race wins.

Formula 3000 and GP2
In 2004 López moved up to International Formula 3000 with the CMS team, finishing sixth overall. He also continued in the V6 Eurocup that year, driving in four races.

López raced in the inaugural season of the GP2 Series in 2005, making him one of only a select few drivers in the series who had previous experience of a full season in Formula 3000, the series which GP2 replaced. He finished ninth in the standings racing for the DAMS team.  For 2006 he moved to the Super Nova Racing team, finishing tenth in the standings.

Return to Argentina

In the early part of 2007, López raced in the American Le Mans Series, racing a Ferrari 430 GT for Corsa Motorsports/White Lightning in the 12 Hours of Sebring, and for Risi Competizione at St. Petersburg.

López also returned to Argentina in 2007 to race in TC 2000, the country's major production-based touring car championship. He was 5th that year, won the drivers' title in 2008, and successfully defended this crown in 2009. López also joined the Turismo Carretera in 2008 and the Top Race V6 in 2009; he became TRV6 champion in 2009. He narrowly lost out on winning the 2009 Turismo Carretera title after crashing out on an oilspill on the 18th lap of the final race of the season, thereby losing the unique opportunity to win three different championships in the same season.

He also competed in selected races of the FIA GT Championship in 2008 for the ACA Argentina team.

Formula One
López was a member of the Renault Driver Development programme between 2004 and 2006, and was test driver for Renault F1 during the  season.

In November 2009 López confirmed that he had a deal in place with the new US F1 Team to race in the 2010 Formula One season, provided he secured an eight million-dollar sponsorship package. Sources close to López claimed he already had eighty percent of the funds needed to secure his place in the team.

López was announced as a driver for US F1 on 25 January 2010. Former F1 driver Carlos Reutemann, a close friend of US F1 principal Peter Windsor and a leading politician in Argentina, helped put the funding package together for López. Complications in USF1's progress and uncertainty over whether USF1 would be able to stay in F1 for 2010 caused rumours to surface that López was in talks with rival team Campos, in order to secure his place in F1. This was confirmed by his manager in late February. On 2 March 2010, he was freed from his contract due to US F1 not being able to attempt to race. On 4 March, Karun Chandhok completed the 2010 grid by signing for Campos (later renamed as the Hispania Racing F1 Team), leaving López without a race drive.

Return to Argentina
In 2010, López remained driving for Honda in the Argentine TC 2000 championship, finishing 6th. In that year he was granted the Platinum Konex Award as the best racing driver of the last decade in Argentina. For 2011 he switched to Fiat. In 2012, he won the (super) TC2000 championship for a third time, with privateer team PSG16.

World Touring Car Championship
He made his World Touring Car Championship début with Wiechers-Sport at the 2013 FIA WTCC Race of Argentina, substituting for their regular driver Fredy Barth. He took both Yokohama Independents' Trophy victories and scored an overall victory in race two.

In 2014, he moved to the Citroën team, and became 2014 World Touring Car Champion, clinching the title at Suzuka, thanks to his dominant race car -the Citroën C-Elysée WTCC that got 17 victories out of 23 races-, but also dominating his two team-mates : Yvan Muller and the circuit races rookie Sébastien Loeb. José María López finished the season with ten victories, close to the Yvan Muller's record.

In 2015, José María López expected to have more difficulties "I am aware the competition is going to be much stronger because the other drivers are going to know me, they will push harder and you can see this already how Honda is pushing more, the Chevrolet drivers and the same in my Citroën team.", yet he still dominated the first part of the season competition with his team-mates on the Citroën C-Elysée WTCC.

Formula E
In July 2016, López was confirmed as DS Virgin Racing's second driver for the third season of the FIA Formula E Championship and finished ninth in the Drivers' championship. He returned to Formula E for the 2017-18 campaign at the Marrakesh round for Dragon Racing, replacing the outgoing Neel Jani.

Racing record

Complete International Formula 3000 results
(key) (Races in bold indicate pole position; races in italics indicate fastest lap.)

Complete GP2 Series results
(key) (Races in bold indicate pole position) (Races in italics indicate fastest lap)

Complete GT1 World Championship results

Complete World Touring Car Championship results
(key) (Races in bold indicate pole position) (Races in italics indicate fastest lap)

Complete Formula E results
(key) (Races in bold indicate pole position; races in italics indicate fastest lap)

† Driver did not finish the race, but was classified as he completed more than 90% of the race distance.

Complete FIA World Endurance Championship results

 Season still in progress.

Complete 24 Hours of Le Mans results

Complete IMSA SportsCar Championship results
(key)(Races in bold indicate pole position)

* Season still in progress.

References

External links

 
 

1983 births
Living people
Sportspeople from Córdoba Province, Argentina
Argentine people of Spanish descent
Argentine racing drivers
Formula Renault Eurocup drivers
Italian Formula Renault 2.0 drivers
Formula Renault V6 Eurocup drivers
International Formula 3000 drivers
GP2 Series drivers
FIA GT Championship drivers
American Le Mans Series drivers
Turismo Carretera drivers
TC 2000 Championship drivers
Top Race V6 drivers
FIA GT1 World Championship drivers
World Touring Car Championship drivers
World Touring Car Champions
Stock Car Brasil drivers
Formula E drivers
24 Hours of Le Mans drivers
24 Hours of Le Mans winning drivers
Súper TC 2000 drivers
Cram Competition drivers
DAMS drivers
Super Nova Racing drivers
Citroën Racing drivers
Envision Virgin Racing drivers
Dragon Racing drivers
Toyota Gazoo Racing drivers
FIA World Endurance Championship drivers
Aston Martin Racing drivers
Scuderia Coloni drivers
Action Express Racing drivers